WVCY is a Christian radio station licensed to Oshkosh, Wisconsin, broadcasting on 690 kHz AM. The station is owned by VCY America.

Programming
WVCY's programming includes Christian Talk and Teaching programming including; Crosstalk, Worldview Weekend with Brannon Howse, Grace to You with John MacArthur, In Touch with Dr. Charles Stanley, Love Worth Finding with Adrian Rogers, Revive Our Hearts with Nancy DeMoss Wolgemuth, The Alternative with Tony Evans, Liberty Counsel's Faith and Freedom Report, Thru the Bible with J. Vernon McGee, Joni and Friends, Unshackled!, and Moody Radio's Stories of Great Christians.

WVCY also airs a variety of vocal and instrumental traditional Christian Music, as well as children's programming such as Ranger Bill.

History
The station began broadcasting on July 1, 1969, and originally held the callsign WAGO. The station featured a Middle-of-the-Road music format, Old Time Radio dramas such as The Shadow, and news from ABC's American Entertainment Radio network. By 1976, the station had begun airing a Top 40 format. In 1983, the station's call sign was changed to WCKK, and it aired the Music of Your Life pop standards format, as "Cake Radio". From 1987 to 1992, the station held the call letters WLKE, initially simulcasting 1170 WLKD as "The Lake", playing music from the 1950s, 1960s, and 1970s. The call letters were changed to WXOL under the ownership of area disc jockey Steve Rose from 1992 to 1995, and the station was branded as "Excellent Oldies" during this period, airing an oldies format. In 1995, the station was sold to VCY America for $190,000, and its call sign was changed to WVCY.

See also
 VCY America
 Vic Eliason
 List of VCY America Radio Stations

References

External links
 VCY America official website

VCY
Radio stations established in 1969
1969 establishments in Wisconsin
VCY America stations